My Santa is a 2019 Indian Malayalam-language comedy drama christmas film, directed by Sugeeth and written by Jemin Cyriac, starring Dileep, Manasvi Kottachi, Devanandha, Sunny Wayne, Anusree and Kalabhavan Shajohn. The film is produced by Nishad Koya, Ajeesh OK, Sajith Krishna and Saritha Sugeeth for the banner of Wall Poster Entertainment. The music is composed by Vidyasagar.

Plot 
Aisa Elizabeth, a second-grader, lost her father, mother, and grandmother in an accident. She is staying with her grandfather. Grandfather, pet Elliamma, loving neighbors and schoolgirl Anna Teresa is her world. 

Santa is the protagonist of Aisa's mind from her grandfather's stories. She hoped that Santa Claus is alive somewhere and that Santa would come to see her once in a while. She also had some wish to ask Santa that Christmas. Last Christmas night, Santa arrives to meet Aisa as she wishes. Santa accompanies her that night to fulfil her wishes.

Cast

 Dileep as Abel Abraham Thekkan / Santa Claus
 Manasvi Kottachi as Isa Elizabeth Jacob
 Devanandha as Anna Theresa, Isa's friend
 Sunny Wayne as Eby Mathew
 Anusree as Deepa Abel
 Sai Kumar as Isa's Grandfather "Kuttoosan"
 Siddique as Paul Pappan
 Kalabhavan Shajon as Shareeff
 Indrans as Krishnan
 Dharmajan as Manukuttan
 Suresh Krishna as Doctor
 Irshad as Deepas Brother 
 Manju Pathrose as Smitha Paul
 Deeraj Rathnam as 
 Shashankan Mayyanad as Manukuttans Friend 
 Anaswara Rajan as Adult Isa (Cameo)
 Aju Varghese as Joji Varghese (Cameo)
 Shine Tom Chacko as Police Officer (Cameo)
  Nandhan Unni as Art Director (Cameo)
 Govind Padmasoorya as Isa's Father (Photo Presence)
 Sshivada as Isa's Mother (Photo Presence)
 Radhika Pandit as Lakshmi (Photo presence)

Music

The music and background score for the film is composed by Vidyasagar. Lyrics were written by Nishad Ahamed and Santhosh Varma.

Release
The film released on 25 December 2019. The satellite rights of the film were bought by Zee Keralam and they released the OTT in Zee5 .

Reception
Ajith of Malayala Manorama wrote that "with ample doses of humor and emotions, My Santa is a feel good entertainer that would excite the young audience and draw families to the theaters this holiday season." Sajin Shrijith of The New Indian Express stated that "this Santa brings a few cheers but no gifts" and added: "My Santa is a film that demands too much from the viewer. In addition to requiring an immense reserve of patience, it requires one to put up with its heightened theatricality, 90s-style melodrama, and excessive sweetness." Sify rated it 3 out of 5 stars and gave the verdict: "Family & Kids special!" The Times of India calling the film "A Christmas gift for children" gave it a 3 out of 5 rating. The reviewer appreciated Baby Manasvi's performance and wrote that she "steals the show with her splendid acting, coming across easily as the loving, innocent and stubborn girl."

See also
 List of Christmas films
 Santa Claus in film

References

External links
 

2019 films
Indian Christmas films
2010s Malayalam-language films
Films about Christianity
Christianity in India
Santa Claus in film
Films directed by Sugeeth